Tod Wodicka (born May 30, 1976) is an American author who grew up in Queensbury, New York, and has lived for over twenty years in Europe, including Manchester, England; Prague; Berlin; and Moscow. He currently divides his time between Rock City Falls, New York City and Berlin, Germany.

He graduated from the University of Manchester in the UK.

Work

Novels

All Shall Be Well; And All Shall Be Well; And All Manner of Things Shall Be Well 
His critically acclaimed first novel, All Shall Be Well; And All Shall Be Well; And All Manner of Things Shall Be Well has been translated into German, Spanish and Dutch. (The title is a quotation from the Christian mystic Julian of Norwich, also quoted by T. S. Eliot in his poem Little Gidding.) The novel was short-listed for the 2008 Believer Book Award. The novel was published by Pantheon Books (US) and Jonathan Cape (UK); and Vintage Books paperback (US & UK).

All Shall Be Well; And All Shall Be Well; And All Manner of Things Shall Be Well tells the story of Burt Hecker, a medieval re-enactor from upstate New York who travels to Prague to find his estranged son Tristan. The book is a darkly comic story about Burt's devotion to another time and his doomed attempts at coming to terms with his own history.

The Household Spirit 
His second novel, The Household Spirit, was published by Pantheon Books (US) and Jonathan Cape (UK) in June 2015. The Household Spirit is about the curious friendship between Howie Jeffries, a shy, 50-year-old recluse and Emily Phane, an irreverent young woman who suffers from horrific sleep paralysis attacks. It takes place in Queens Falls, the same fictional upstate New York town Wodicka wrote about in All Shall Be Well; And All Shall Be Well; And All Manner of Things Shall Be Well. The novel was awarded a Kirkus Star and was critically acclaimed in The New Yorker, The Financial Times, Esquire Magazine, The Sunday Times, Artforum, Tank Magazine and The Independent.

Other Work 
Tod Wodicka's essays, criticism and fiction has appeared in The Guardian, Granta, Tank (magazine), New Statesman, South as a State of Mind, AnOther Magazine, The National, Art Papers, BBC Radio 4 and BBC Radio 3. He wrote the afterword to David Tibet of Current 93's art book, Some Gnostic Cartoons. He has been a resident at Yaddo; a literary fellow at the Akademie Schloss Solitude in Stuttgart, Germany; and a writer in residence at Het beschrijf at Passa Porta in Belgium.

Bibliography

External links

Selected Essays

 (on the new behavioral traditions of the Legend of Zelda: Breath of the Wild)
 (on Travel Writing & the End of the World)
 (on Travel Writing & Vengeance & Elton John's house)
 (a musical playlist for "The Household Spirit")
 (on almost dying from a pimple in a Czech hospital)
 (On exploring the comments section of adult websites)
 (on being trapped in Germany, his young son and Brideshead Revisited)
 (on Philip Roth's Nathan Zuckerman novels)
 (on pirates, mustaches and discovering his father's homosexuality)

Radio
 BBC Radio 3 The Essay  (on suffering from Sleep Paralysis and possibly having magical powers and/or mental illness)
 WAMC Northeast Public Radio (Interview about the novel, "The Household Spirit")
 BBC World Service - Outlook- radio program (a reading by and interview with Tod Wodicka)
 BBC Radio 4 Short Story  (on dark alcoholic fun in Albany, New York airport hotels)

Interviews
 BBC World Service
 WAMC Northeast Public Radio
 ExBerliner 2015
 Der Freitag (Interview in German.)
 ExBerliner 2011
 Das Fragebuch / The Question Book

Reviews of All Shall Be Well; And All Shall Be Well; And All Manner of Things Shall Be Well
 
 
 
 

Reviews of The Household Spirit
 The New Yorker
 The Independent (Wodicka uses two characters’ incompatibility to his advantage, creating a dialogue of disorientation and a plot which slips seamlessly between points of view.)
 Kirkus Reviews (Starred: Wodicka’s fluid, expressive prose—dotted with quotable observations often as odd as his players—serves well his weaving of such a convincing, unexpected story from eccentricity, pain, and need.)
 The Sunday Times
 Financial Times

Notes

21st-century American novelists
American male novelists
1976 births
Living people
People from Glens Falls, New York
People from Queensbury, New York
21st-century American male writers
Novelists from New York (state)